The 1970–71 Australian region cyclone season was the second most active tropical cyclone season in the Australian Region.

Systems

Severe Tropical Cyclone Andrea-Claudine

Andrea, 31 October to 11 November 1970 in central Indian Ocean

Tropical Cyclone Carmen

Tropical Cyclone Carmen developed on November 20 and left the basin on November 26.

Severe Tropical Cyclone Beverley-Eva

Beverley, 26 November to 1 December 1970 in Arafura Sea. The decayed storm developed into Eva.

Severe Tropical Cyclone Dominique-Hilary

Severe Tropical Cyclone Dominique-Hilary developed on December 11 and left the basin on December 17.

Tropical Cyclone Janet

Janet, 19 to 25 December 1970 in central Indian Ocean

Tropical Cyclone Loris

Loris, 26 to 31 December 1970 crossed the Pilbara coast near Mandora with no serious damage.

Severe Tropical Cyclone Myrtle-Ginette

Myrtle-Ginette, 15 to 18 January 1971 near Cocos Island and moved west

Tropical Cyclone Polly

Polly formed in the Indian Ocean west of the Keeling Islands and existed from 20 to 29 January.

Tropical Cyclone Rita

Rita existed from 23 to 30 January 1971 passed over Exmouth, Western Australia with flood damage only.

Severe Tropical Cyclone Sheila-Sophie

Sheila-Sophie, 29 January to 6 February 1971 crossed the coast near Roebourne, Western Australia, while doing some damage.

Tropical Cyclone Aggie

Aggie, 1 to 4 February 1971 in Gulf of Carpentaria and Arnhem Land

Tropical Cyclone Dora

Cyclone Dora formed in the Coral sea east of Proserpine on February 10, 1971, it took a southeasterly track over the next 4 days away from the QLD coast turning into a low pressure system well east of the QLD NSW border. On February 17 the system reintensified into a cyclone east of the Gold Coast and crossed the coast north of Brisbane at Redcliffe. Widespread structural damage was reported with power lines down and roofs removed.

Severe Tropical Cyclone Tilly-Iphigenie

Severe Tropical Cyclone Tilly-Iphigenie existed from February 10 to February 14.

Tropical Cyclone Gertie

Gertie, 11 to 16 February 1971 crossed near Townsville, Queensland.

Tropical Cyclone Ida

Ida, 15 to 22 February 1971 in Coral Sea

Tropical Cyclone Kalinka

Severe Tropical Cyclone Fiona

Severe Tropical Cyclone Fiona existed from February 16 to February 28.

Severe Tropical Cyclone Yvonne-Lise

Severe Tropical Cyclone Yvonne-Lise developed on February 19 and left the basin on February 23.

Severe Tropical Cyclone Maggie-Muriel

Severe Tropical Cyclone Maggie-Muriel developed on March 7 and left the basin on March 13.

Tropical Cyclone Lena

Lena, 13 to 20 March 1971 near New Caledonia

Severe Tropical Cyclone Mavis

Mavis, 23 to 29 March 1971 crossed coast near Denham, Western Australia causing flooding.

See also

 Atlantic hurricane seasons: 1970, 1971
 Eastern Pacific hurricane seasons: 1970, 1971
 Western Pacific typhoon seasons: 1970, 1971
 North Indian Ocean cyclone seasons: 1970, 1971

References

Australian region cyclone seasons
Aust
 disasters in Australia
 disasters in Australia
 disasters in Oceania
 disasters in Oceania